The 2016 Indianapolis 500 (branded as the 100th Running of the Indianapolis 500 presented by PennGrade Motor Oil for sponsorship reasons) took place on Sunday, May 29, 2016, at the Indianapolis Motor Speedway in Speedway, Indiana. It was the premier event of the 2016 Verizon IndyCar Series season. In a shocking finish, 24 year-old rookie Alexander Rossi of Andretti Herta Autosport won the race on fuel mileage over Carlos Muñoz and Josef Newgarden. Two-time winner Juan Pablo Montoya entered the race as the defending champion.

Over the final ten laps, most of the leaders were cycling through pit stops, as no one was expected to make it to the finish without pitting for fuel. Most drivers had not pitted since the previous caution that ended on lap 166. Alexander Rossi's team took a huge gamble and coached the driver into saving fuel. As the other leaders made their stops, Rossi inherited the lead on lap 197. He slowed down to save fuel, but on the final lap Carlos Muñoz began charging to catch up. Coming out of turn four on the final lap, Rossi pulled to the inside and literally coasted across the finish line, to take the checkered flag. Muñoz finished 4.4975 seconds behind, his second runner-up finish at Indy (2013, 2016). Rossi was out of fuel, and came to a stop during his cool down lap. A tow truck brought him in, believed to be the first time in Indy history the race winner was towed back to victory lane. 

The 2016 race marked a milestone as the 100th running of the Indianapolis 500. The race came five years after the event's Centennial Era, a three-year long commemoration which celebrated the 100th anniversary of the opening of the circuit (1909), and the 100th anniversary of the first Indy 500 (1911). The 2016 running was the ninety-ninth scheduled 500-mile race of the canon, as the 1916 race was scheduled as a 300-mile race. It also commemorated the bicentennial of Indiana statehood.

The month of May activities at the Speedway opened May 14 with the third annual Grand Prix of Indianapolis. Indianapolis 500 practice began on Monday, May 16. Time trials were held on May 21–22, with James Hinchcliffe winning the pole position. Carb Day, the traditional final practice session, and the annual Pit Stop Challenge, was held May 27. Considerable pre-race hype surrounded the milestone event, and for the first time the race was announced as a complete sellout (both grandstand tickets and infield). Due to the sellout, the local television blackout of the ABC broadcast was lifted for the first time ever.

Race background
Going into the race, Simon Pagenaud of Team Penske had mostly dominated the first five races of the 2016 IndyCar season. He finished second in the first two events (St. Petersburg and Phoenix), and won the next three races (Long Beach, Alabama, and the Grand Prix of Indianapolis) to take a sizable lead in the championship points standings.

The most discussed issues in the weeks leading up the race involved the ongoing development of aero kit regulations, and the competitive balance between the two engine manufacturers (Chevrolet and Honda). After three major crashes in 2015, in which cars flipped over and became airborne, series officials attempted to address the situation by adding "dome skids" - aerodynamic devices affixed to the undertrays of the cars, designed to keep the cars on the ground during a crash. This rule change was met with some resistance, particularly from the Honda teams, after testing revealed them to be unsettling to the cars' handling. After practice opened, however, the issues appeared to have been mostly resolved. None of the crashes that occurred during practice or qualifying saw the respective cars flip over. With respect to the engine competition, Chevrolet entered the month having swept all five race wins and all five race pole positions. In addition, Chevrolet had noticeably outperformed Honda in the 2015 race, sweeping the top five spots in qualifying, as well as the top four positions on race day. After practice opened, however, Honda teams led the speed chart on three of the four days (one day was rained out), and also secured the pole position - Honda's first Indy 500 pole since 2011.

Early in the month of May, Speedway officials announced that the grandstand seating for the race had sold out. It marked the first sell-out since before 2003.

On May 25, Speedway officials announced that the race had reached a total sellout with all general admission tickets sold. In addition, it was announced that for the first time since 1950, the race would not be blacked out for the local audience.

This race would turn out to be the final race of Alex Tagliani's career. For 2017 and onwards, Tagliani would shift his focus to mainly NASCAR. This would also be the final race for Townsend Bell after 13 seasons in IndyCar. After this race, Bell would shift his focus to sports cars racing in the IMSA SportsCar Championship from 2017 onwards.

Entry list

 Matthew Brabham, son of Geoff Brabham, and grandson of Sir Jack Brabham entered with KV Racing Technology. Brabham became the third third-generation driver to qualify in Indy 500 history. The previous two were Billy Vukovich III and Marco Andretti.  The car carried No. 61.
 Sage Karam drove for Dreyer & Reinbold Kingdom Racing in the No. 24 Gas Monkey Energy / Havoline-sponsored Chevy.
 Bryan Clauson drove for Dale Coyne Racing-Jonathan Byrd's Racing in the No. 88.
 Pippa Mann drove for Dale Coyne Racing.
 Buddy Lazier drove for Lazier Partners Racing. The 2016 running marked the 20th anniversary of Lazier's Indy 500 victory.
 Spencer Pigot drove for Rahal Letterman Lanigan Racing.
 Alex Tagliani drove for A. J. Foyt Enterprises. Tagliani drove the No. 35 car in honor of Foyt's record of 35 consecutive starts in the race as a driver.
 J. R. Hildebrand drove the No. 6 car for Ed Carpenter Racing.
 Townsend Bell drove the No. 29 car for Andretti Autosport.
 Oriol Servià drove a third entry for Schmidt Peterson Motorsports. The Honda-powered car featured No.77 and was in conjunction with Marotti Racing.
 Stefan Wilson drove for KVSH Racing. Stefan is the younger brother of Justin Wilson, who was killed in a racing incident at the ABC Supply 500 in August 2015. The car carried No. 25, a tribute to the number Justin drove in the 2015 season.

 Winner 
 Rookie

Regulations and rule changes
Minimum car weight was increased from 1580 pounds to 1610 pounds to accommodate enhancements made to the Suspension Wheel/Wing Energy Management System (SWEMS).
Rookie Orientation was revised for 2016. Each rookie driver was required to complete the following three phases: 10 laps at 210-215 mph; 15 laps at 215-220 mph; 15 laps at over 220 mph. The changes represented an increase of 5 mph as compared to the previous year.
All cars utilized a uniform E85 fuel mixture. Previously, Chevrolet entries were allowed an additive.
Domed skid plates and rear wing beam flaps were made mandatory. Domed skids were affixed to the underside of the chassis, designed to reduce the chance of cars becoming airborne during a crash. Rear wing beam flaps deploy during a spin or when the car is travelling backward and disrupt the airflow to create downforce and reduce the chance of a car becoming airborne.
Each entry was allowed 36 sets of tires (Firestone) total, for practice, time trials, and for the race. This remained the same from 2015. The special compound "red" tires are not used for oval events.
Engines were permitted 130 kPa of turbocharger "boost" during practice from May 16–20. Cars were allowed 140 kPa of "boost" on Fast Friday practice, and during time trials. The "boost" level reverted to 130 kPa for Carb day and race day.

Sponsorship 
For the first time in race history, the Indianapolis 500 had a presenting sponsor: the PennGrade brand of the Lebanon, Indiana-based D-A Lubricant company. D-A Lubricant has had a long history of involvement in the Indianapolis 500, having historically sponsored teams at the race in the late-1950s, and being a current associate sponsor of Rahal Letterman Lanigan Racing. Although terms of the deal were not officially announced, the Indianapolis Star reported via sources that it is a three-year deal valued around $5 million.

Pre-race ceremonies
Darius Rucker performed "The Star-Spangled Banner".
 Chris Pine was the honorary starter.

Schedule

Source: Indianapolis Motor Speedway

Testing and rookie orientation

Manufacturer's test – Tuesday, April 5
Four Chevrolet teams and one Honda team conducted a private test at the Speedway on Tuesday, April 5. The test was primarily to evaluate dome skids, a titanium safety device affixed to the underside of the chassis intended to reduce the chance of cars becoming airborne in a crash. Honda teams had already tested the dome skids once at Fontana. A new rear wing flap was also added being tested.

Marco Andretti was the lone Honda participant on Tuesday. Chevrolet participants included Sébastien Bourdais, Ed Carpenter, Hélio Castroneves, Scott Dixon and Juan Pablo Montoya. Temperatures were cool, and no incidents were reported.

Safety test – Wednesday, April 6
Weather: , mostly cloudy and windy
Summary: An open test was held on Wednesday, April 6 to allow teams to test new and old aero kit configurations for use during the month of May. Marco Andretti (223.427 mph) set the fastest lap of the day in a Honda machine. Simon Pagenaud (221.293 mph) was the fastest of the Chevrolet participants. A total of fifteen cars attended the test. Weather conditions were not favorable. Winds gusted to 40 mph, with temperatures in the low 60s (°F). After a morning test session, a rain shower closed the track for two hours during the middle of the afternoon. After the track was dried, a late afternoon session was held. No incidents were reported.

One week after the test sessions, IndyCar officials announced revised regulations for the aero kits. The domed skid plates were made mandatory, and optional underwing sidewalls were extended.

Rookie Orientation and Refresher Tests –  Monday, May 16
Rookie orientation and veteran refresher tests were held on the first day of practice from 12:00 p.m. to 2:00 p.m. The 40-lap rookie test consisted of three phases demonstrating car control, placement, and a consistent driving pattern. Phase one consists of 10 laps over 210 mph, phase two consists of 15 laps at 215 mph, and phase three requires 15 laps at over 220 mph. Five rookies took part in the session. Alexander Rossi, Max Chilton, and Spencer Pigot passed all three phases. Matthew Brabham and Stefan Wilson passed the first two phases, and were permitted to pass the third phase during any open practice session. Both successfully completed the final phase in the full-field session later that day.

Practice

Monday, May 16

Weather: , overcast
Practice summary: The first day of practice was scheduled Monday, May 16. The day opened with the rookie orientation and refresher tests. Townsend Bell led the way in the early session, while rookies Max Chilton, Spencer Pigot, and Alexander Rossi each completed all three stages of the orientation program. At 2:00 p.m., the track was opened for the full field. During this time, the other two rookies, Matthew Brabham and Stefan Wilson, successfully completed their orientation programs. All 33 entries completed at least installation laps during the four hour session, with a grand total of 1,474 laps being turned on the day. No major incidents occurred during the session. Andretti Autosport led the speed chart for the day, with five of the top six drivers being from the team. Marco Andretti set the fastest lap of the day at 228.978 mph, while teammate Townsend Bell set the fastest "no-tow" lap at 223.940 mph.

Tuesday, May 17
Weather: , cloudy and rain
Practice summary:  Rain washed out practice for the day. The track was closed at 2:45 p.m. It was the first practice day completely lost due to rain since 2011.

Wednesday, May 18

Weather: , partly cloudy
Practice summary: At 1:55 p.m., Spencer Pigot suffered the first crash of the week. In turn one, Pigot did a half-spin, and slid into the outside wall with the left side of the car. Pigot climbed from the car uninjured, but the car was heavily damaged. No other accidents occurred on the day, but two mechanical failures would also bring brief halts to practice. Around 3:20 p.m., Matthew Brabham rolled to a halt in turn three with no power to his car. Just after 5:00 p.m., the second mechanical failure of the day occurred when the engine on Mikhail Aleshin's car failed and began spewing smoke down the backstretch. Aleshin rolled to a stop in turn three. While not as dominant as the Monday session, Andretti Autosport once again led the day, with Ryan Hunter-Reay setting the fastest lap at 228.202 mph. Josef Newgarden led the way in "no-tow" laps, turning a 224.541 mph lap late in the session.

Thursday, May 19

Weather: , mostly sunny
Practice summary: All 33 entries took to the track for practice, completing 2,563 laps. No major accidents occurred during the day, but mechanical failures again brought brief halts to practice. Just after 3:30 p.m., Juan Pablo Montoya rolled to a halt in turn three with no power to his car. Practice was halted while his car was towed in. At roughly 4:00 p.m., Ryan Hunter-Reay suffered an engine failure coming down the backstretch. Hunter-Reay brought the car to a halt at the exit of turn three. Dale Coyne Racing's Gabby Chaves became the first driver outside of the Andretti Autosport stable to lead a practice session, with a lap at 227.961 mph. Will Power led the "no-tow" rankings with a speed of 225.381 mph. After crashing on Wednesday, Spencer Pigot returned to the track in a back-up car for one "shake-down" lap just before the session ended.

Fast Friday — Friday, May 20

Weather: , overcast, rain late
Practice summary: Turbocharger "boost" settings were increased from 130 kPa to 140 kPa for the "Fast Friday" practice session. At 12:30 p.m., Marco Andretti became the first driver of the week to break the 230 mph barrier. Will Power set the fastest lap of the day 232.672 mph. Power also had a "no-tow" lap of 231.339 mph. At 4:05 p.m., the track was closed for about 45 minutes due to moisture from a brief, light rain shower. The track re-opened in time for the final "Happy Hour" session. At the end of the day, a total of fourteen drivers broke the 230 mph barrier. Townsend Bell set the fastest "no-tow" lap of the day at 231.672 mph.

Time trials

First Day — Saturday, May 21
Weather: , partly cloudy early, mostly sunny late
Morning rain delayed the start of practice until 12:30 p.m. Six minutes into the practice session, Max Chilton spun in turn two and crashed into the outside wall. He was not seriously injured. Alexander Rossi set the fastest lap of the practice session at 231.249 mph. Officials announced that time trials would be extended to 7 p.m., to account for lost track time due to the moisture and weepers. The top nine qualifiers for the day would be locked in, and advance to the Top Nine Shootout on Sunday. The drivers for positions 10-33 would also be determined, but the actual starting positions will not set until Sunday.

Qualifying began at 2:15 p.m. Tony Kanaan was the first driver to complete an attempt. The early qualifiers were led by Josef Newgarden (230.229 mph), who tentatively took the top spot of the qualifying chart. Rising track temperatures, and wind gusts in turn one, were making qualifying runs challenging for drivers. About an hour later, at 3:40 p.m., Townsend Bell upped the speed to 230.452 mph, and took over the top spot.

At 4:24 p.m., Pippa Mann was on her qualifying run, when a rear wing end fence failed. The car broke into a spin in turn two, scrubbed off speed, and tagged the outside wall twice. It came to rest against the inside wall. The car suffered moderate damage, and Mann was not injured. The track stood mostly quiet over the next hour, as teams awaited better track conditions, and waited to see who would make the first move to re-qualify.

At 5:52 p.m., Mikhail Aleshin was the first car to get in line to re-qualify, and improved on his earlier speed. Within moments, teams up and down the pit lane began scrambling to get into the qualifying line. Teams could elect to get into one of two lines. The normal qualifying allowed drivers an opportunity to re-qualify, but if they did not improve, they could revert to the earlier speed. The "fast track" line allowed drivers to move directly to the front of the queue, but at the expense of withdrawing their earlier speed. Hélio Castroneves set the tone for the final hour, moving to position 1 with a speed of 230.500 mph. Not to be upstaged, James Hinchcliffe went even faster (230.946 mph). In the final minutes, Marco Andretti made a last-ditch effort to make the Fast Nine. With seven minutes left, Andretti bumped out his teammate Ryan Hunter-Reay. Hunter-Reay answered, putting himself second, and bumping Andretti out of the Fast Nine. With just seconds left before the final gun, Mikhail Aleshin got out onto the track for one more run. Aleshin bumped his way into the top nine as time expired. All top nine qualifiers were over the 230 mph barrier.

Second Day — Sunday, May 22
Weather: , mostly sunny
Pole Day qualification saw warmer temperatures than the previous day's trials with roughly the same amount of wind, resulting in lower speeds and an even slicker track. Qualifications began with the determining of positions 10 through 33. Early in the session, Alex Tagliani lost control of his car, hit the outside wall, then slid back across the track and tapped the pit lane attenuator with the nose of his car. Tagliani was uninjured, but the crash forced him to start in last place. Later in the session, a minor incident occurred where a trash bag blew onto the course in the middle of Juan Pablo Montoya's run. Montoya ran over the trash bag, causing a massive loss in downforce for the remainder of the run. IndyCar officials allowed Montoya to retry his run due to the circumstances. The 10-33 position session was topped by Schmidt Peterson Motorsports Oriol Servià with a speed of 229.060 mph. Marco Andretti, who was one of the fastest cars during the week, was hampered in his run due a broken fifth gear, relegating him to a 14th place start.

Fast Nine qualifying began shortly after the final run from the first group. Josef Newgarden held the fastest time for much of the session with a speed of 230.700 mph. However, his time was beat at the last moment by the final qualifier of the day, James Hinchcliffe, who went just fast enough to best Newgarden with a speed of 230.760 mph. Hinchcliffe's pole came one year after his near fatal accident during practice for the previous years running of the race. The pole also marked Schmidt Peterson Motorsports first pole position at Indianapolis since Alex Tagliani won pole in 2011.

Post-qualifying practice

Monday, May 23

Weather: , sunny
Post-qualifying practice was scheduled on Monday, May 23. The session was scheduled only until 4:00 p.m. to allow practice for Indy Lights later in the day. The teams converted their cars back to race setups and boost was reduced back to race day levels. All 33 cars appeared on track, mainly participating in drafting and race simulations. One incident occurred during the day just after 3:10 p.m., when fire erupted from the left rear on the car of Jack Hawksworth. Hawksworth emerged from the car quickly. Despite the shortened session, more laps were turned during the day than any other practice session prior, with a total of 2886 laps. Chevrolet cars took the first four spots in the speed charts for the day, with Josef Newgarden running the fastest lap at 227.414 mph.

Carb Day

Practice — Friday, May 27

Weather: , partly cloudy
Carb day practice was scheduled Friday, May 27. Practice was only scheduled for 70 minutes to allow for other events later in the day. The day also turned out to be the warmest practice session of the month. One incident occurred during the day when Pippa Mann slapped the wall coming off of turn four early in the session. Tony Kanaan set the fastest time of the day at 226.280 mph.

Pit Stop Challenge

Source:

Starting grid
(R) = Indianapolis 500 rookie; (W) = Former Indianapolis 500 winner

Race

First half

Raceday featured partly cloudy skies and temperatures in the low  range. Hélio Castroneves had a small issue getting his car started, but quickly resumed his place on the grid. During the first parade lap, smoke began to come from underneath the car of Buddy Lazier, stemming from what was later reported to be a stuck throttle. Lazier would not return to the race until roughly a quarter of the way through.

Start
Pole starter James Hinchcliffe led the field into the first turn, but was passed on the backstretch by Ryan Hunter-Reay, who led the first lap of the race. From here, the first quarter of the race became a three-way battle for the lead between Hunter-Reay, Hinchcliffe, and Josef Newgarden. The first round of pit stops occurred during this time, which served to spread out the field and separate the leaders from the rest of the pack. They also allowed for Townsend Bell to join in on the battle for the lead. On lap 47, the first caution of the day flew for debris on the backstretch. During the ensuing pit stops, an incident occurred when Will Power pushed Tony Kanaan against the pit lane wall while exiting his own pit stall. Power was penalized for the incident (Unsafe Pit Exit Release) and sent to the rear of the field.

Second quarter
Green flag racing resumed on lap 54 with Ryan Hunter-Reay in the lead. The battle between him and James Hinchcliffe resumed with the two swapping the lead regularly. The battle was interrupted on lap 64 when defending champion Juan Pablo Montoya lost control of his car in turn two and hit the outside wall. This marked the first time that Montoya failed to finish an Indy 500. Pit stops again occurred during this yellow. A second pit lane incident occurred when Simon Pagenaud, who had been running well up in the field, bumped into the car of Mikhail Aleshin while leaving his pit box. Pagenaud, just as his teammate Will Power, was sent to the back of the field for the incident (Unsafe Pit Exit Release). During the pit stop sequence, Will Power elected to stay out, giving him the lead.

The race was attempted to be resumed on lap 71, but reports of moisture briefly delayed the restart. The race went back green on lap 74, where Will Power was quickly shuffled back by James Hinchcliffe and Ryan Hunter-Reay, who once again resumed their duel for the lead. At roughly lap 90, Hélio Castroneves joined the leading group and inherited the lead for the first time on lap 92. The third caution of the day came out just laps later on lap 94, when Sage Karam went wide while trying to pass Townsend Bell and slapped the wall in turn one. Karam's car slid against the wall all the way to the backstretch. Pit stops occurred during the yellow with no major incidents. Bryan Clauson stayed out to lead three laps during this yellow before making his own stop, promoting Castroneves back into the lead. Also during this yellow, Simon Pagenaud began to report that the engine in his car had started to misfire, effectively ending his chances of winning the race.

Second half

Halfway
The green flag came out again on lap 104. Hélio Castroneves led for the opening few laps after the restart, but soon fell behind Ryan Hunter-Reay, Townsend Bell, and Tony Kanaan. These three would fight for the lead for the next several laps, swapping positions regularly. On lap 115, the 4th caution period of the race occurred when the rear suspension on the car of Mikhail Aleshin broke, sending him spinning into the turn one wall. Conor Daly was also collected in the incident after spinning in an attempt to avoid Aleshin's car. Daly retired from the race due to the incident, while Aleshin would eventually return after many laps of repair.

Yellow flag pit stops during this caution period brought one of the most pivotal moments of the race. As cars exited the pits, previous race leader Townsend Bell attempting to gain position contacted with Hélio Castroneves, sending Bell into a spin that collected Ryan Hunter-Reay. Bell and Hunter-Reay would both fall off the lead lap due to the incident, while Castroneves was not greatly affected. During these pit stops, Alex Tagliani and Alexander Rossi elected not to pit, putting them off sequence from the rest of the field.

Racing resumed on lap 121 with Alex Tagliani in the lead. Alex Tagliani matched a record set by Tom Sneva in the 1980 race and became the second driver in Indy 500 history to start last and lead laps during the race.

The battle for the lead became a battle between Tagliani and Alexander Rossi for roughly 15 laps, before both drivers had to come in for their own pit stops. This handed the battle for the lead back to Hélio Castroneves and Tony Kanaan. On lap 149, Castroneves and Kanaan appeared to be leading what would be another round of green flag pit stops. However, just as both reached their pit boxes, the fifth caution of the day occurred when a tire from Buddy Lazier's car came off the car and onto the race surface in turn two. Lazier would retire from the race due to damage caused from trying to drive with only three wheels. Yellow flag pit stops would once again occur, cycling Castroneves and Kanaan back to the front of the field. Several cars would be sent to the rear of the field during this caution for entering a closed pit lane in order to have emergency fuel service.

Fourth quarter
Racing resumed on lap 158 with Hélio Castroneves in the lead, but Tony Kanaan took the lead almost immediately. A four-way battle for the lead ensued as Castroneves and Kaanan were joined by Josef Newgarden and James Hinchcliffe. On lap 161, Castroneves's chances of winning were dashed when J. R. Hildebrand clipped the left rear bumper pod on Castroneves's car, forcing him to the pit to make repairs. Castroneves caught a small break, though, when the sixth and final caution of the race flew just two laps later after Takuma Sato hit the outside wall at the exit of turn four. Believing all cars would need to stop again, most drivers made yellow flag pit stops.

The green flag flew once again on lap 167. The battle for the lead became a three way duel between Tony Kanaan, Josef Newgarden, and Carlos Muñoz. J. R. Hildebrand also ran in the lead group, but was off sequence in pit stop strategy and came in much earlier than anyone else.

Finish

With 10 laps to go, it became apparent that the leaders would need a splash of fuel to get the cars to the end of the race. Of the leading group, Tony Kanaan would be the first to pit, followed by Josef Newgarden a few laps later, and finally Carlos Muñoz with five laps to go. It appeared the winner would be the driver with the best pit stop.

When Muñoz made his stop, the lead of the race passed to Alexander Rossi, who had been 10th at the time of the previous restart. With the guidance of Bryan Herta, Rossi attempted to gamble on fuel and finish the race without another pit stop. With two laps to go, Rossi began to slow considerably in order to bring the car to the finish. As the white flag fell, Rossi held a lead of over 20 seconds. Despite running a final lap at less than 180 mph and coasting from turn 4 to the finish line, Rossi was able to hang on to win by roughly 4.5 seconds over his teammate Carlos Muñoz. Rossi was the first rookie to win the Indianapolis 500 since 2001 when Hélio Castroneves took victory in his first attempt. Rossi would eventually run out of fuel on the cool-down lap, requiring his car to be towed into Victory Lane.

Box score

Notes

 Points include qualification points from Time Trials, 1 point for leading a lap, and 2 points for most laps led.

Source for time gaps:

Championship standings after the race

Drivers' Championship standings

Manufacturer standings

 Note: Only the top five positions are included.

Broadcasting

Television
The Indianapolis 500 was broadcast live in the United States on ABC and streaming on WatchESPN and the ESPN app, called by Allen Bestwick, Scott Goodyear and Eddie Cheever. The broadcast utilized 100 television cameras, including 36 on-board cameras on twelve cars. Pre-race coverage began race morning with SportsCenter on the Road live at the Speedway with hosts Matt Barrie, Sara Walsh, Marty Smith and Ryan McGee.

On May 25, Speedway officials announced that all grandstand and general admission tickets had sold out. As a result, the local television blackout of the ABC network telecast was lifted for the first time since the race went to live "flag-to-flag" coverage in 1986. For Indianapolis viewers, it was the first time since 1950 that they were able to watch the race live on local television (the 1949 and 1950 races were broadcast locally on WFBM-TV, but Speedway officials barred live television coverage after 1950 out of fear that such broadcasts would cut into live attendance).

The race was also aired in Spanish through ABC's SAP channel in the United States and Puerto Rico and on ESPN in all of Latin America (except for Brazil), called by Andrés Agulla and Alex Pombo.

The race was also aired in Portuguese through the Band and BandSports channels in Brazil, called by Téo José and former IndyCar driver Felipe Giaffone.

Radio
The race was carried live by the IMS Radio Network, part of the Advanced Auto Parts IndyCar Radio Network. Paul Page announced his retirement from the crew, and handed over play-by-play duties to the new "Voice of the 500" Mark Jaynes. Page, and fellow former chief announcers Bob Jenkins, and Mike King, took part in the pre-race coverage. Page called the pace laps and the start of the race, then handed the call over to Jaynes for the completion of the first lap. Jenkins recorded commentary for the pre-race, then spent the day at his normal role on the public address announcing team. Page, as well as Mike King, visited the booth during the race and during the post-race for guest commentary. The pre-race coverage was extended from one hour to two hours, with the first hour celebrating the 100th running with recaps and highlights of past races.

With Jaynes moving from his long-time position in turn three (2000-2015) to the Pagoda booth, the announcing crew shuffled slightly from previous years. Jake Query, previously a pit reporter, and then the turn two reporter, took over the turn three position. Nick Yeoman, also previously a pit reporter, took over the turn two location. Historian Donald Davidson celebrated his 52nd year as a part of the broadcast, and Jerry Baker his 43rd. This was Baker's 29th year reporting from turn one, which is believed to be the second-longest tenure of any reporter in one of the turns - second only to Jim Shelton in turn four (32 years). Newcomer Rob Howden joined the crew in the pits. Dave Wilson returned to the crew, this time monitoring the race coverage and impressions on social media. No reporters were specifically assigned to the garage area and/or track medical center, but pit reporter Rob Howden made one roving report at each location.

During the broadcast, the commercial out-cues were recited by Jaynes, and the historical chief announcers (like 2009, 2011-2013). During commercial breaks, the classic Stark & Wetzel "whistle" jingle was also used, as well as a classic Stark & Wetzel commercial, reflecting the famous former sponsor of the network from the 1950s and 1960s. Sponsor guests included Mark Reuss (GM), Dale Herrigle (Firestone), James Verrier (BorgWarner), and Speedway president Doug Boles.

1070 The Fan broadcast nightly beginning May 2 with Trackside with Curt Cavin and Kevin Lee, followed by Donald Davidson's The Talk of Gasoline Alley.

Footnotes

References

Indianapolis 500
Indianapolis 500
Indianapolis 500
Indianapolis 500 races
Indianapolis 500
21st century in Indianapolis